This is a list of Curaçao national football team games in 2015.

2015 games

References 

2015
2015 national football team results
2014–15 in Curaçao football
2015–16 in Curaçao football